The Rational Dress Society was an organisation founded in 1881 in London, part of the movement for Victorian dress reform. It described its purpose thus:

The Rational Dress Society protests against the introduction of any fashion in dress that either deforms the figure, impedes the movements of the body, or in any way tends to injure the health. It protests against the wearing of tightly-fitting corsets; of high-heeled shoes; of heavily-weighted skirts, as rendering healthy exercise almost impossible; and of all tie down cloaks or other garments impeding on the movements of the arms. It protests against crinolines or crinolettes of any kind as ugly and deforming... [It] requires all to be dressed healthily, comfortably, and beautifully, to seek what conduces to birth, comfort and beauty in our dress as a duty to ourselves and each other.

In the catalogue of its inaugural exhibition, it listed the attributes of "perfect" dress as:

Leading members of the Society were Lady Harberton (who created the divided skirt), Mary Eliza Haweis and Constance Wilde (Irish author). Oscar Wilde helped spread the word by publishing essay "The Philosophy of Dress" in which he stressed the important relationship between clothing and one’s soul. Woman cyclists, such as members of the Lady Cyclists' Association, were keen advocates of women's right to dress appropriately for the activity, as part of a belief that cycling offered women an opportunity to escape overly restrictive societal norms.

In 1889, a member of the Rational Dress Society, Charlotte Carmichael Stopes, staged a coup at a meeting of the British Association for the Advancement of Science in Newcastle upon Tyne, when she arranged an impromptu addition to the programme on the subject of rational dress. Her speech was reported by newspapers across Britain and the notion of rational dress was the biggest news from the meeting.

See also
 Svenska drägtreformföreningen
 National Dress Reform Association
 Artistic Dress movement
 Bicycling and feminism

References

19th-century fashion
Clothing controversies
History of clothing (Western fashion)
Anti-fashion
Women's rights in England
Women's health
1881 establishments in the United Kingdom
19th century in London